The Shubert Organization is a theatrical producing organization and a major owner of theatres based in Manhattan, New York City. It was founded by the three Shubert brothers in the late 19th century. They steadily expanded, owning many theaters in New York and across the country. Since then it has gone through changes of ownership, but is still a major theater chain.

History
The Shubert Organization was founded by the Shubert brothers, Sam S. Shubert, Lee Shubert, and Jacob J. Shubert of Syracuse, New York – colloquially and collectively known as "The Shuberts" – in the late 19th century in upstate New York, entering into New York City productions in 1900. The organization produced a large number of shows and began acquiring theaters. Sam Shubert died in 1905; by 1916 the two remaining brothers had become powerful theater moguls with a nationwide presence.

In 1907, the Shuberts tried to enter vaudeville with the United States Amusement Co. In the spring of 1920 they made another attempt, establishing the Shubert Advanced Vaudeville with Lee Shubert as President and playing two shows per day in Boston, Dayton, Detroit, Cleveland, Chicago, Philadelphia and in September 1921 opening in New York.

In April 1922, the Shuberts teamed with Isidore Herk and E. Thomas Beatty to form the Affiliated Theatres Corporation, which would book shows for the chain. Faced with fierce competition from the B. F. Keith Circuit, the Shuberts closed their vaudeville operation in February 1923.

By 1929, the Shubert Theatre chain included Broadway's most important venues, the Winter Garden, the Sam S. Shubert, and the Imperial theaters, and owned, managed, operated, or booked nearly a thousand theaters nationwide. The company continued to produce stage productions in New York until the 1940s, returning to producing Broadway productions in the 1970s after a hiatus.

The company was reorganized in 1973, and as of 2016 owned or operated seventeen Broadway theaters in New York City, two off-Broadway theaters — Stage 42 and New World Stages — and the Forrest Theatre in Philadelphia. It leases Boston's Shubert Theatre to the Citi Performing Arts Center. Shubert Ticketing, which includes Telecharge, handles tickets for 70 theaters.

Several former Shubert-owned theaters across the United States are still referred to by the Shubert name. One of the most famous is the New Haven Shubert, the second theater ever built by the Shubert Organization. Until the 1970s, major Broadway producers often premiered shows there before opening in New York. It was immortalized in many mid-20th century films, such as All About Eve.

Another important regional theater was the Shubert in Chicago, Illinois, located within the Majestic Building at 22 West Monroe Street. Originally known as the Majestic Theatre, the Shubert Organization purchased it in 1945 and rechristened it the "Sam Shubert Theatre". The Shuberts sold the theatre to the Nederlander Organization in 1991 and is now known as the CIBC Theatre.

In 2016, it sold longtime headquarters at 1700 Broadway, to Ruben Cos for $280 million.

Theatres

Broadway

 Ambassador Theatre
 Ethel Barrymore Theatre
 Belasco Theatre
 Booth Theatre
 Broadhurst Theatre
 Broadway Theatre
 John Golden Theatre
 Imperial Theatre
 Bernard B. Jacobs Theatre
 James Earl Jones Theatre
 Longacre Theatre
 Lyceum Theatre
 Majestic Theatre
 Music Box Theatre
 Gerald Schoenfeld Theatre
 Shubert Theatre
 Winter Garden Theatre

Off-Broadway
 Stage 42
 New World Stages

Regional
 Forrest Theatre (Philadelphia)
 Shubert Theatre (Boston)

Former theatres

Broadway

 Avon Theatre
 Adelphi Theatre (1944–1970)
 Bijou Theatre
 Casino Theatre (from 1903)
 Central Theatre (1918–1988)
 Century Theatre
Century Theatre Roof
 Comedy Theatre (1909–1931)
 Cosmopolitan Theatre
 Maxine Elliott Theatre (1906–1956)
 Forrest Theatre (1925–1945)
 44th Street Theatre (1912–1945)
Nora Bayes Theatre (on roof)
 49th Street Theatre
 46th Street Theatre (1935–1945)
 Sam H. Harris Theatre
 Herald Square Theatre (1900–?)
 Hippodrome Theatre (1906-1915)
 Jolson's 59th Street Theatre
 Lyric Theatre (1903–?)
 Madison Square Theatre
 Majestic Theatre (Columbus Circle)
 Manhattan Center (1911–1922)
 Morosco Theatre
 National Theatre (?-1956)
 New Century Theatre
 Princess Theatre (29th St) (1902–1907)
 Ritz Theatre (1921–1956)
 St. James Theatre (1941–1957)
 Waldorf Theatre

Subway Circuit
 Bronx Opera House, Bronx
 Riviera Theatre, Manhattan 
 Shubert Majestic Theatre, Brooklyn
 Teller's Shubert Theatre, Brooklyn

Regional

 Harmanus Bleecker Hall (Albany)
 Capitol Theatre (Albany)
 Auditorium Theatre (Baltimore)
 Boston Opera House (Boston)
 Colonial Theatre (Boston) (?-1957)
 Columbia Theatre (Boston) (1903–1904)
 Majestic Theatre (Boston) (1903–1956)
 Plymouth Theatre (Boston) (1927–1957)
 Wilbur Theatre (Boston)
 Teck Theatre (Buffalo)
 Blackstone Theatre (Chicago) (1948–1989)
 Erlanger Theatre (Chicago)
 Garrick Theater (Chicago) (1903–?)
 Great Northern Theatre (Chicago)
 Olympic Theatre (Chicago)
 Princess Theatre (Chicago)
 Shubert Grand Opera House
 Shubert Theatre (Chicago) (1945–1991)
 Cox Theatre (Cincinnati)
 Shubert Theatre (Cincinnati)
 Colonial Theatre (Cleveland)
 Hanna Theatre (Cleveland)
 Cass Theatre (Detroit) (1926–1962)
 Garrick Theatre (Detroit)
 Shubert-Lafayette Theatre (Detroit) (1925–1957)
 Parsons Theatre (Hartford)
 Murat Theatre (Indianapolis)
 Shubert Theatre (Kansas City)
 Shubert's Missouri Theatre (Kansas City)
 Shubert Theatre (Los Angeles) (1972–2002)
 Shubert Theatre (Newark)
 Shubert Theatre (New Haven) (1914–1941)
 Adelphi Theatre (Philadelphia)
 Chestnut Street Opera House (Philadelphia)
 Locust Theatre (Philadelphia) (?-1956)
 Lyric Theatre (Philadelphia)
 Shubert Theatre (Philadelphia) (1918–1957)
 Walnut Street Theatre (Philadelphia) (1941–1969)
 Providence Opera House (Providence)
 Shubert Theater (Saint Paul) (1910–1933)
 Alvin Theatre (Pittsburgh)
 Duquesne Theatre (Pittsburgh)
 Pitt Theatre (Pittsburgh)
 Baker Theatre (Rochester) (1899–?)
 Cook Opera House (Rochester) (1898–1899)
 Curran Theatre (San Francisco)
 Garrick Theatre (St. Louis)
 Shubert Theatre (St. Louis)
 Bastable Theatre (Syracuse) (1897–?)
 Grand Opera House (Syracuse)
 Wieting Opera House (Syracuse)
 Town Hall Theatre (Toledo) (1945–1953)
 Royal Alexandra Theatre (Toronto)
 Rand Opera House (Troy, New York)
 Majestic Theatre (Utica)
 Belasco Theatre (Washington, D.C.)
 Poli's Theatre (Washington, D.C.)
 Shubert Theatre (Washington, D.C.)
 Shubert-Garrick Theater (Washington, D.C.)
 National Theatre (Washington, D.C.) (1980–2012)
 Playhouse Theatre (Wilmington, Delaware)

London
Waldorf Theatre (1905–1909)

See also 
Shubert family

References
Notes

Further reading

External links

Official website
Shubert Foundation website
Shubert Archive website
  Shubert Theatre Organization materials, 1977–1997, held by the Billy Rose Theatre Division, New York Public Library for the Performing Arts

 
Theatre-owning companies
American theatre managers and producers
Entertainment companies based in New York City
Mass media companies based in New York City
Special Tony Award recipients
Broadway theatre